Gung ho is an English term, with the current meaning of "overly enthusiastic or energetic".

The linguist Albert Moe concluded that the term is an "Americanism that is derived from the Chinese, but its several accepted American meanings have no resemblance whatsoever to the recognized meaning in the original language" and that its "various linguistic uses, as they have developed in the United States, have been peculiar to American speech." In Chinese, concludes Moe, "this is neither a slogan nor a battle cry; it is only a name for an organization." 

The term was picked up by United States Marine Corps Major Evans Carlson from his New Zealand friend, Rewi Alley, one of the founders of the Chinese Industrial Cooperatives. Carlson explained in a 1943 interview: "I was trying to build up the same sort of working spirit I had seen in China where all the soldiers dedicated themselves to one idea and worked together to put that idea over. I told the boys about it again and again. I told them of the motto of the Chinese Cooperatives, Gung Ho. It means Work Together — Work in Harmony." 

Carlson used gung ho as a motto during his unconventional command of the 2nd Marine Raider Battalion, leading to other marines adopting the term to mean overly enthusiastic. From there, it spread throughout the U.S. Marine Corps, where it was used as an expression of spirit, and then into American society as a whole when the term was the title of a 1943 war film, Gung Ho!, about the 2nd Raider Battalion's raid on Makin Island in 1942. 

The artist Billy Joel used the expression in "Goodnight Saigon", his 1982 hit single about the Vietnam War, which had the lyric: "And we were sharp, as sharp as knives, and we were so gung ho to lay down our lives". Singer Patti Smith released an album titled Gung Ho in March 2000 with a 11 minute, 45 second closing track also entitled "Gung Ho". Gung-Ho is the code name of one of the members of the G.I. Joe team in the Hasbro toylike and associated fiction. He's depicted as a member of the U.S. Marine Corps.

See also 
 List of United States Marine Corps acronyms and expressions

References

External links 

 
 
 
 

1940s neologisms
Chinese words and phrases
Cooperatives
Military slang and jargon
United States Marine Corps lore and symbols